Doolan Canyon is a canyon in Alameda County, California, northwest of Livermore.

Geography 
It is located east of Tassajara Road, and south of the Contra Costa County border. Cottonwood Creek flows through Doolan Canyon.

Nature 
Doolan Canyon has high amounts of Tufa and Alkaline water.

Loggerhead shrikes, a species of bird, have also been found around the area.

East Bay Regional Park District says that the Doolan Canyon area is habitat for the endangered species Alameda whip snake and red-legged frog. It also supports other "special status" species and some rare alkali soil plants.

History 
On May 24, 2007, Livermore and Dublin announced a plan to preserve the canyon.

On March 4, 2019, the valley was given 160 more acres of land.

References 

Valleys of California
Valleys of Alameda County, California